The Latvia women's national basketball team is the national women's basketball team representing Latvia. It is administrated by the Latvian Basketball Association. It has participated in EuroBasket Women three times and once in the Olympic Games.

History
Golden age of Latvia women's national basketball team was from 2007 to 2009, when head coach was Ainars Zvirgzdiņš. In EuroBasket 2007 Latvia first time in history reached semi-final. In third place game they lost to Belarus. This result allowed to get in 2008 Olympic Qualifying Tournament, which had overpowered in next summer in Madrid, and Latvia took part of 2008 Summer Olympics.

EuroBasket 2009 was held in Latvia. In this tournament Latvia reached quarterfinal, where they lost to Russia in overtime with 64–69. They also lost to Italy in classification rounds. Latvia got seventh place in this tournament. After this tournament head coach Ainars Zvirgzdiņš and several players left national team.

In EuroBasket 2011 head coach was Greek basketball coach George Dikeoulakos. In his management Latvia also reached quarterfinal, but latterly got eighth place.

In EuroBasket 2013 head coach was Aigars Nerips, Latvia lost all of three games.

In EuroBasket 2015 Latvia lost in the first round.

In EuroBasket 2017, Mārtiņš Zībarts was assigned to manage the national team, Latvia got out of the low tide and reached quarterfinal, they got sixth place finally.

In EuroBasket 2019, Mārtiņš Zībarts was still in charge of the national team, Latvia was eliminated in qualification for quarterfinals.

Tournament record

Olympic Games
2008 : 9th

World Cups
2018 : 13th

EuroBasket

Team

Current roster
Roster for the FIBA Women's EuroBasket 2019.

Notable players
Gunta Baško-Melnbārde
Anete Jēkabsone-Žogota
Uljana Semjonova (played in Soviet Union team)
Ieva Tāre

Notable coaches
George Dikeoulakos
Armands Krauliņš
Ainars Zvirgzdiņš
Aigars Nerips

References

External links

Official website
FIBA profile

National, women's
Basketball, women's
Women's national basketball teams